Park is an electoral ward in Windsor, Berkshire. It is represented by two councillors (Phillip Bicknell and Natasha Airey of the Conservative Party) in the Royal Borough of Windsor and Maidenhead.  Nationally, the ward forms part of the UK Parliamentary constituency of Windsor and is represented by Adam Afriyie of the Conservative Party.

On 1 December 2011, there were 3,702 voters on the electoral roll for the ward.

Royal Borough representation
The two seats for the councillors representing the ward in the Royal Borough are determined by the Multi-member plurality system (the two candidates who receive the plurality of the votes cast).  Royal Borough elections are held every four years.

Past election results

References

Wards of the Royal Borough of Windsor and Maidenhead